Cavill Avenue light rail station is located in the heart of the Gold Coast in the suburb of Surfers Paradise. The station is part of the Gold Coast's G:link light rail system and is located on the corner of Surfers Paradise Boulevard and Cavill Avenue.

Location 
Cavill Avenue is located in the heart of Surfers Paradise, the Gold Coat's premier tourist destination. The station provides direct access and exposure to Cavill Avenue Mall, Paradise Centre Shopping Centre and the famous Surfers Paradise Beach. The station is surrounded by numerous Hotels and resorts including The Soul tower and The Hilton.

Below is a map of the local area. The station can be identified by the grey marker.{
  "type": "FeatureCollection",
  "features": [
    {
      "type": "Feature",
      "properties": {},
      "geometry": {
        "type": "Point",
        "coordinates": [
          153.42839717835886,
          -28.001523465204077
        ]
      }
    }
  ]
}

External links 
 G:link

References 

G:link stations
Railway stations in Australia opened in 2014
Surfers Paradise, Queensland